A by-election was held for the Australian House of Representatives seat of Wentworth on 11 April 1981. This was triggered by the resignation of Liberal MP Robert Ellicott.

Future Prime Minister of Australia Malcolm Turnbull was unsuccessful for Liberal preselection, with the by-election won by the preselected Liberal candidate Peter Coleman.

Results

Distribution of preferences

Peter Coleman attained a quota (an absolute majority of formal votes) when two other candidates were left in the count, meaning that no two-party-preferred figure was attained.

See also
 List of Australian federal by-elections

References

1981 elections in Australia
New South Wales federal by-elections